"Ooh La La" is a song from the soundtrack of the Indian feature film, The Dirty Picture (2011). The song was released by major Indian label T-Series on 30 October 2011 as a single from the soundtrack. It was composed by the duo Vishal–Shekhar, written by Rajat Aroraa, and sung by Shreya Ghoshal and Bappi Lahiri.

Background 
The song is a re-creation of "Ui Amma, Ui Amma, Mushkil Yeh Kya Ho Gayi" from Mawaali.

Music video

Filming

Synopsis

Release

Charts

Awards

References 

Hindi film songs
Indian songs